Coledale railway station is located on the South Coast railway line in New South Wales, Australia. It serves the seaside village of Coledale opening in July 1902. The station building was built in 1915 when the line was duplicated.

Platforms & services
Coledale has one island platform with two faces. It is serviced by NSW TrainLink South Coast line services travelling between Waterfall and Port Kembla. Some peak hour and late night services operate to Sydney Central, Bondi Junction and Kiama.

References

External links

Coledale station details Transport for New South Wales

Buildings and structures in Wollongong
Railway stations in Australia opened in 1902
Regional railway stations in New South Wales
Short-platform railway stations in New South Wales, 6 cars